Berry Sport and Recreation Centre  in Berry, New South Wales, Australia, caters for family, vacation and school camps as well as conference and facility hire. The Centre is managed by NSW Sport and Recreation.

Recreation Hall
Berry Sport and Recreation centre has an award-winning recreation hall.

Inspiration
The Berry Sport and Recreation Centre is designed dominantly with the idea of simple investigation of capture and escape of light within and out of the building during the day and to blend this massive and heavy farm-like building into the night sky at night in order to integrate the structure into the existing site.

The initial brief was to aim for a simple robust multipurpose recreation hall within a secure economic constraint, while allocating a safe and enclosed environment for children and adults.

The result after a deeper study of insight has led to solid and evidence material which is prefabricated concrete which has satisfy the qualities in term of programme and cost control as this idea has also eliminated over twenty steel columns and 1.2 kilometres of roofpurlin from the design budget. At the same time, the sophisticated thin large scale concrete wall of the building formed a distinctive and natural ventilation system in summer and a heat plume for insulation in winter.

Architecture
There are five hundred irregular starlight holes arrayed and perforated on the finished concrete walls, reflecting a joyful, lively and light -filled space in which children will feel enchanted.

The penetration and movement of the sunlight at different times within the building illustrated a regular animation of the floor in terms of intensity and colour throughout the day. While during the night where the light source as well as the skies is inverted, the building itself has becomes a set of illuminating starlight which blending with the night sky.

Awards
2008 Australian Institute of Architects (AIA) Blacket Prize for Regional Architecture

2008 Australian Institute of Architects (AIA) Award for Public Architecture

2009 World Architecture Festival (WAF) Winner in Sport Category

2009 Concrete Institute of Australia Award for Excellence in Concrete

External links
 Berry Sport Recreation Hall Review
 Concrete
 Berry Hall and Recreation Centre Location

References

Buildings and structures completed in 2007
Sports venues in New South Wales